Mettupalayam taluk is a taluk of Coimbatore district of the Indian state of Tamil Nadu. The headquarters of the taluk is the town of Mettupalayam.

Demographics
According to the 2011 census, the taluk of Mettupalayam had a population of 259,633 with 129,299 males and 130,334 females. There were 1,008 women for every 1,000 men. The taluk had a literacy rate of 71.93%. Child population in the age group below 6 years were 10,571 Males and 10,259 Females.

See also
 Odanthurai

References 

Taluks of Coimbatore district